Raymond Rowe Sr. (born August 21, 1984) is an American professional wrestler currently signed to WWE, where he performs on the SmackDown brand under the ring name Erik. He is also known for his work in Ring of Honor (ROH), where he and his tag team partner Hanson (collectively known as War Machine in ROH) are former ROH World Tag Team Champions and IWGP Tag Team Champions.

Professional wrestling career

Early career (2003–2013) 
Rowe was trained by Josh Prohibition and Lou Marconi. He debuted on the independent circuit in May 2003.

On June 9, 2006, episode of Smackdown!, Rowe competed against Mark Henry in a losing effort.

Ring of Honor (2013–2017) 
Rowe made his Ring of Honor debut on June 1, 2013 in a losing effort against Bobby Fish. Following this, he returned to ROH on January 4, 2014, as part of that year's Top Prospect Tournament and defeated Kongo in a first round match. After managing to advance to the finals, Rowe ultimately lost the Tournament to Hanson. Despite this, Rowe began regularly performing for ROH following the tournament in addition to forming the tag team War Machine with Hanson on April 4, 2014.

In August, Rowe was seriously injured in a motorcycle accident and was out of action for several months. On March 1, 2015, Rowe made his return to ROH at the promotion's 13th Anniversary Show by assisting his partner Hanson after the World Championship main event. On August 22, War Machine defeated Killer Elite Squad (Davey Boy Smith Jr. and Lance Archer) in a non-title match and afterwards challenged them to a match for their GHC Tag Team Championship, a title owned by the Japanese Pro Wrestling Noah promotion. War Machine received their title shot in Japan on September 19, but were defeated by the Killer Elite Squad. On December 18 at Final Battle, War Machine defeated The Kingdom (Matt Taven and Michael Bennett) to win the ROH World Tag Team Championship. They lost the title to The Addiction (Christopher Daniels and Frankie Kazarian) on May 9, 2016, at War of the Worlds. War Machine finished with ROH on December 16, 2017.

Japan (2015–2018) 

On September 14, 2015, Rowe and Hanson made their Japanese debuts for Pro Wrestling Noah, teaming with Takashi Sugiura in a six-man tag team main event, where they defeated Suzuki-gun (Davey Boy Smith Jr., Lance Archer and Minoru Suzuki). This led to a match five days later, where War Machine unsuccessfully challenged Smith and Archer for the GHC Tag Team Championship.

In November 2016, War Machine made their debut for New Japan Pro-Wrestling (NJPW) by entering the 2016 World Tag League. They finished the tournament on December 7 with a record of four wins and three losses, failing to advance to the finals.

On April 9, 2017, at Sakura Genesis 2017, War Machine defeated Tencozy (Hiroyoshi Tenzan and Satoshi Kojima) to win the IWGP Tag Team Championship. They lost the title to Guerrillas of Destiny (Tama Tonga and Tanga Loa) on June 11 at Dominion 6.11 in Osaka-jo Hall, regaining it in a no disqualification match on July 1 at G1 Special in USA. They lost the title to Killer Elite Squad in a three-way match, also involving Guerrillas of Destiny, on September 24 at Destruction in Kobe.

WWE (2018–present)

On January 16, 2018, WWE announced that Rowe had signed a contract with the company and would be reporting to the WWE Performance Center. On the April 11 episode of NXT, he and Hanson, now called the War Raiders, made their television debuts, attacking Heavy Machinery (Otis Dozovic and Tucker Knight) and the team of Riddick Moss and Tino Sabbatelli. On the October 17 episode of NXT, they challenged The Undisputed Era (Kyle O'Reilly and Roderick Strong) for the NXT Tag Team Championship, but won by disqualification after Bobby Fish attacked them with a steel chair; thus, they did not win the titles. The War Raiders would go on to main event NXT TakeOver: WarGames II, teaming with Ricochet and Pete Dunne against The Undisputed Era in the WarGames match with The War Raiders, Dunne and Ricochet winning the match. At NXT TakeOver: Phoenix, Rowe and Hanson defeated The Undisputed Era to win the NXT Tag Team Championship. They successfully defended their tag team championships at NXT TakeOver: New York against the team of Ricochet and Aleister Black. After having successful defenses with the NXT Tag Titles, both Rowe and Hanson would relinquish the titles after both men believed no team in NXT could beat them for the titles.

During the Superstar Shakeup event, Rowe and his partner Hanson would debut on Raw and be renamed Ivar and Erik. They also would be repackaged with the new name "The Viking Experience". The following week the team was renamed to The Viking Raiders. On the October 14, 2019, episode of Monday Night Raw Erik would capture the Raw Tag Team championships alongside his partner Ivar as "The Viking Raiders" by defeating the team of Dolph Ziggler and Robert Roode. At TLC, The Viking Raiders would host an open challenge for the Raw Tag Titles and The O.C would answer the challenge, but the match would end in a double countout. Erik and Ivar would lose the titles to the team of Seth Rollins and Buddy Murphy on the January 20, 2020, episode of Monday Night Raw after their reign lasted for 98 days. During the summer, The Viking Raiders would feud with The Street Profits which would lead to a match between the two teams at Backlash  At the event, the match had never started because both teams would begin fighting in the parking lot and eventually team up as "the Viking Profits" to take out Akira Towzawa and his Ninja's.

On September 7 episode Raw, The Viking Raiders teamed up with Apollo Crews and Ricochet in an eight-man tag team match against The Hurt Business in a losing effort, where Cedric Alexander scored the pinfall over Ricochet. The match was forced to an abrupt ending due to Ivar suffering a legitimate cervical injury during the match. On October 7, Erik would announce that he would be out of action after having surgery on his bicep.

On the April 13 episode of Raw, Erik along with Ivar, would return and defeat the team of Cedric Alexander and Shelton Benjamin. On the June 7 episode of Raw, The Viking Raiders would win a battle royal to determine to #1 contenders for the Raw Tag Titles. It would be announced that The Viking Raiders would face the Raw Tag Team champions, AJ Styles and Omos at Money In The Bank. At the event, The Viking Raiders would be unsuccessful, as Styles and Omos would retain their titles. On the July 19 episode of Raw, The Viking Raiders, alongside Riddle, would defeat the team of John Morrison, AJ Styles and Omos. Later that night, it would be announced that The Viking Raiders would face AJ Styles and Omos for the Raw Tag Titles in a rematch on next weeks episode of Raw. On the July 27 episode of Raw, The Viking Raiders would fail to win the Raw Tag Titles, as Styles and Omos retained.

As part of the 2021 Draft, both Erik and Ivar were drafted to the SmackDown brand.

Personal life
Rowe, along with his teammate Todd Smith, are adherents to the straight edge lifestyle.

During his time with WWE, Rowe began dating fellow wrestler Sarah Bridges (then known as Sarah Logan and later Valhalla). The pair were married on December 21, 2018, in a Viking themed wedding. On February 9, 2021, Bridges and Rowe welcomed a son named Raymond Cash Rowe.

Championships and accomplishments 

Anarchy Unified Heavyweight Championship (1 time)
World Hardcore Championship (1 time)
Absolute Intense Wrestling
AIW Absolute Championship (1 time)
J.T. Lightning Tournament (2015)
Gauntlet for the Gold (2006 - AIW Absolute Championship)
Brew City Wrestling
BCW Tag Team Championship (1 time) – with Hanson
Cleveland All-Pro Wrestling
CAPW Heavyweight Championship (1 time)
CAPW Tag Team Championship (1 time) – with Jason Bane
Firestorm Pro Wrestling
Firestorm Pro Heavyweight Championship (1 time)
International Wrestling Cartel
IWC World Heavyweight Championship (1 time)
IWC Tag Team Championship (1 time) – with J-Rocc
New Japan Pro-Wrestling
IWGP Tag Team Championship (2 times) – with Hanson
NWA Branded Outlaw Wrestling
NWA BOW Heavyweight Championship (1 time)
 NWA BOW Outlaw Championship (1 time)
NWA Lone Star
NWA Lone Star Junior Heavyweight Championship (1 time)
NWA Lone Star Tag Team Championship (1 time) – with Jax Dane
NWA Wrestling Revolution
NWA Grand Warrior Championship (2 times)
Pro Wrestling Illustrated
Ranked 97 of the 500 best singles wrestlers in the PWI 500 in 2016
Real Action Wrestling
Real Action Wrestling Championship (1 time)
Ring of Honor
ROH World Tag Team Championship (1 time) – with Hanson
River City Wrestling
RCW Championship (1 time)
VIP Wrestling
VIP Heavyweight Championship (2 times)
VIP Tag Team Championship (1 time) – with Hanson
What Culture Pro Wrestling
WCPW Tag Team Championship (1 time) – with Hanson
WWE
WWE 24/7 Championship (1 time)
NXT Tag Team Championship (1 time) – with Hanson
WWE Raw Tag Team Championship (1 time) – with Ivar

References

External links
 
 
 
 
 

1984 births
American male professional wrestlers
Living people
Sportspeople from Cleveland
Professional wrestlers from Ohio
WWE 24/7 Champions
NXT Tag Team Champions
21st-century professional wrestlers
ROH World Tag Team Champions
IWGP Heavyweight Tag Team Champions